Scottish band The Proclaimers have released eleven studio albums, six compilation albums, one extended play and twenty-five singles.

Albums

Studio albums

Compilation and remastered albums

EPs
17 (2009) – promotional acoustic EP

Singles

DVDs
The Best of The Proclaimers 1987–2002 (2002)

Songs used in soundtracks
The Crossing (1990) (song, "King of the Road")
Benny & Joon (1993) (song, "I'm Gonna Be (500 Miles)")
Dumb and Dumber (1994) (song, "Get Ready")
Bye Bye Love (1995) (song, "Bye Bye Love")
Bottle Rocket (1997) (song, "Over and Done With")
Slab Boys (1997) (songs, "Maybe Baby" and "No Particular Place to Go")
The Closer You Get (2000) (song, "I'm Gonna Be (500 Miles)")
Shrek (2001) (song, "I'm on My Way")
How I Met Your Mother (2007, 2009, 2013 – episodes "Arrivederci, Fiero"; "Duel Citizenship"; "Mom and Dad") (song, "I'm Gonna Be (500 Miles)")
Mama's Boy (2008) (song, "Then I Met You")
Burke and Hare (2010) (song, "I'm Gonna Be (500 Miles)")
The Angels' Share (2012) (song, "I'm Gonna Be (500 Miles)")
Bachelorette (2012) (song, "I'm Gonna Be (500 Miles)")
Grey's Anatomy season 9 (song, "I'm Gonna Be (500 Miles)")
Pitch Perfect (2012) (song, "I'm Gonna Be (500 Miles)")
Identity Thief (2013) (song, "I'm Gonna Be (500 Miles)")
Uncle (TV series) (2015 – season 2, episode 6) (song, "Over and Done With")
Peter Rabbit (2018) (song, "I'm Gonna Be (500 miles)")

Soundtrack albums
Sunshine on Leith (2013) (from the film Sunshine on Leith – cover versions by film actors)

References

Discographies of British artists